Raffaele Frasca was an Italian sports shooter. He competed in eight events at the 1920 Summer Olympics.

References

External links
 

Year of birth missing
Year of death missing
Italian male sport shooters
Olympic shooters of Italy
Shooters at the 1920 Summer Olympics
Sportspeople from Naples